9 Hours is an Indian Telugu-language survival crime thriller streaming television series created by Krish Jagarlamudi, directed by Niranjan Kaushik and has an ensemble cast of Taraka Ratna, Madhu Shalini, Ajay, Ravi Varma and Ravi Prakash. 9 Hours was premiered on Disney+ Hotstar on 2 June 2022.

Cast

Episodes

Reception 
Sangeetha Devi Dundoo of The Hindu in her review stated that "The payoffs in the form of twists and turns happen rather late and are not enough. Perhaps it was alluring to have nine episodes to befit the title, but the series could have done with liberal trimming". Echoing the same, Pinkvilla's Arvind V opined that "The survival drama trappings deserved a better canvas, and a profound script. Torture and beatings are no substitute for thrills and drama".

Comparing it with Money Heist, Latha Srinivasan of Firstpost praised the performances of the ensemble cast while criticizing the screenplay and writing. Giving a mixed review, Neeshita Nyayapati of The Times of India wrote that "You don’t always buy what 9 Hours is selling you, there are moments you will pause and wonder how plausible whatever is playing out on screen is. But the series does manage to do its job by keeping you engaged".

References

External links 

 
 9 Hours on Disney+ Hotstar

2022 web series debuts
Telugu-language web series
Telugu-language Disney+ Hotstar original programming
Crime web series
Indian crime drama television series
Indian drama web series
Television shows based on Indian novels
Crime thriller web series
Web series based on novels
Television series about organized crime
Television series set in 1985